Demailly is a French surname. Notable people with the surname include: 

Alexis Demailly (born 1980), French trumpeter and cornetist
Jean-Pierre Demailly (1957–2022), French mathematician

See also
De Mailly

French-language surnames